Sandy is the third, and self-titled, Cantopop album by Sandy Lam, released on CBS/Sony Records 19 Feb 1987.

Track listing
 Ashes of Love (愛的廢墟)
 East and West (東方西方)
 Lost (迷亂)
 Innocent Diary (純情筆記)
 Unexpected Meeting (邂逅)
 Passion (激情) - Cantonese cover of Take My Breath Away by Berlin
 Tough Heroine (獨行少女)
 Love Sparks (情愛火花)
 Mind Made Up (決絕)
 Nightwing (夜行人)

References

Sandy Lam albums
1987 albums